Powers is a city in Coos County, Oregon, United States. The population was 689 at the 2010 census.

Geography
Forest roads connect Powers to the Rogue River,  further south. The Glendale–Powers Bike Trail passes through Powers.

Climate
Powers has cool, very wet winters and warm, mostly dry summers.

The influence of the Pacific Ocean moderates the climate, especially in the summer when the temperature regularly drops into the upper 40s to lower 50s at night. Annually, there are 6.5 days with highs of 90 °F (32 °C) or higher and 45.1 days with lows of 32 °F (0 °C) or lower.

While snow is common during the winter in the mountains surrounding Powers, the city itself averages only  of snow each year. The snowiest year was 1950 when  fell, including  in January.

Powers has a warm-summer Mediterranean climate (Csb) according to the Köppen climate classification system.

History
In 1914, according to Oregon Geographic Names, the city was named for Albert H. Powers, vice president and general manager of the Smith-Powers Logging Company. Powers post office was established in 1915.

Points of interest
The Wagner House, thought to be the oldest pioneer dwelling in the region, is in Powers adjacent to a railroad museum. Along the main road is the United States Forest Service (USFS) Powers District office. Nearby is Powers County Park, which offers overnight camping and other amenities. About  further south along the Coquille–Rogue Scenic Byway is the Siskiyou National Forest, with many other campgrounds. Powers celebrates Independence Day (July 4) with its White Cedar Days festival.

Education
Powers is served by two public schools; one elementary (K–6) and one high school, Powers High School (7–12).

Demographics

2010 census

As of the census of 2010, there were 689 people, 314 households, and 172 families residing in the city. The racial makeup of the city was 85.1% White, 4.1% Native American, 0.3% Asian, 0.6% from other races, and 10.0% from two or more races. Hispanic or Latino of any race were 4.4% of the population.

There were 314 households, of which 22.6% had children under the age of 18 living with them, 38.5% were married couples living together, 10.8% had a female householder with no husband present, 5.4% had a male householder with no wife present, and 45.2% were non-families. 34.7% of all households were made up of individuals, and 19.5% had someone living alone who was 65 years of age or older. The average household size was 2.19 and the average family size was 2.81.

The median age in the city was 51.8 years. 19.7% of residents were under the age of 18; 5.4% were between the ages of 18 and 24; 15.8% were from 25 to 44; 34.9% were from 45 to 64; and 24.2% were 65 years of age or older. The gender makeup of the city was 52.0% male and 48.0% female.

2000 census
As of the census of 2000, there were 734 people, 334 households, and 184 families residing in the city. The population density was 921.2 people per square mile (354.2/km). There were 403 housing units at an average density of 505.8 per square mile (194.5/km). The racial makeup of the city was 84.06% White, 6.54% Native American, 0.54% Asian, 0.14% Pacific Islander, 0.14% from other races, and 8.58% from two or more races. Hispanic or Latino of any race were 2.32% of the population. There were 334 households, out of which 22.8% had children under the age of 18 living with them, 42.2% were married couples living together, 9.0% had a female householder with no husband present, and 44.9% were non-families. 38.3% of all households were made up of individuals, and 21.6% had someone living alone who was 65 years of age or older. The average household size was 2.20 and the average family size was 2.92.

In the city, the population was 24.1% under the age of 18, 5.3% from 18 to 24, 21.3% from 25 to 44, 27.5% from 45 to 64, and 21.8% who were 65 years of age or older. The median age was 45 years. For every 100 females, there were 98.4 males. For every 100 females age 18 and over, there were 95.4 males. The median income for a household in the city was $21,615, and the median income for a family was $23,750. Males had a median income of $30,536 versus $27,750 for females. The per capita income for the city was $12,544. About 16.3% of families and 23.5% of the population were below the poverty line, including 34.6% of those under age 18 and 13.6% of those age 65 or over.

Transportation
Powers Airport

References

External links

 Entry for Powers in the Oregon Blue Book
 Powers Public School District

Cities in Oregon
Cities in Coos County, Oregon
Company towns in Oregon
1915 establishments in Oregon